Tajiddin M. Smith-Wilson (born September 30, 1983) is a professional gridiron football wide receiver who is currently a free agent. He recently played for the Saskatchewan Roughriders of the Canadian Football League. He was signed by the Green Bay Packers as an undrafted free agent in 2008. He played college football at Syracuse and Bakersfield College.

He has also been a member of the Indianapolis Colts.

College career
Bakersfield Community College Bakersfield: Set the single-season school record with 53 catches in 2005 ... First player in Bakersfield history to catch more than 50 passes in a season ... Compiled 960 yards and 10 touchdowns last season, which both rank third on the single season ledger ... Had 95 catches in his two years with the Renegades, which is tied for the highest total in school history ... His 1,670 career receiving yards and 16 career touchdowns both rank second all-time ... First-team all-conference and an honorable mention All-American ...

Professional career

Green Bay Packers
In his first 2008 preseason game with the Green Bay Packers, Smith caught two passes for 23 yards against the Cincinnati Bengals. He was waived by the team during final cuts on August 30.

Indianapolis Colts
Smith was signed to the practice squad of the Indianapolis Colts on September 25, 2008. He was released on December 3, but re-signed on December 8. After finishing the season on the practice squad, Smith was re-signed to a future contract on January 5, 2009. He spent the 2009 season on the practice squad, and was re-signed to a future contract on February 11, 2010.
Taj Smith was cut on the Indianapolis Colts roster cut down day and was a free agent. He was later re-signed to add depth to Indianapolis's depleted receiver corps. On December 5, in a game against the Dallas Cowboys Smith blocked a punt and recovered it in the endzone, tying the game for the Colts. Played in all 4 preseason games in 2011. He finished with 12 catches, 210 yards and 2TD and in the last preseason game he ended well with 8 catches, 140 yards, and the game winning Touchdown.

On September 3, 2011, Smith was waived by the Colts.

Saskatchewan Roughriders
Smith signed with the Saskatchewan Roughriders of the CFL on January 30, 2012. In his first year in the CFL he spent the first four weeks on the practice roster and missed 1 game due to injury. Smith would go on to start 13 regular season games and the West Semi-Final at the wide receiver position. He finished with 47 catches for 690 yards and 2 touchdowns. Smith also played special teams adding 3 tackles, and had 4 catches for 81 yards in the playoffs.

In his second season in the CFL Smith became a more significant element of the Roughriders offense. Smith played in 17 of the 18 regular season games and totaled 1,007 receiving yards (7th most in the league) on 78 passes with 7 touchdowns. He added 191 receiving yards in 3 playoff games, and the Roughriders went on to win the 101st Grey Cup. On January 16, 2014, Smith signed a new contract with the Roughriders, he was to become a free-agent in February 2014 if he was not signed.

Statistics

References

External links
Saskatchewan Roughriders bio 
Indianapolis Colts bio
Syracuse Orange bio

1983 births
Living people
Players of American football from Newark, New Jersey
Players of Canadian football from Newark, New Jersey
American football wide receivers
Syracuse Orange football players
Green Bay Packers players
Indianapolis Colts players
Saskatchewan Roughriders players